Antal Bélafi (November 26, 1925 – September 29, 1992) was a Hungarian agronomist and politician, member of the National Assembly (MP) from FKGP Veszprém County Regional List between 1990 and 1992.

Biography
He was born into a farmer family. He finished his secondary school studies in Budapest and Veszprém. He joined the Independent Smallholders, Agrarian Workers and Civic Party (FKGP) in 1945. He participated in the reorganization of the FKGP during the Hungarian Revolution of 1956.

Bélafi secured a mandate in the first democratic parliamentary election in 1990. He was a member of the Committee on Environment since February 23, 1992. In February 1992 he joined the United Smallholders' Party (EKGP) which continued to support the Cabinet of József Antall in contrast to the FKGP parliamentary group led by József Torgyán. He died on September 29, 1992. He was replaced by Sándorné Sümegi ("Mrs. Sándor Sümegi") on November 2, 1992.

References

1925 births
1992 deaths
Hungarian agronomists
Independent Smallholders, Agrarian Workers and Civic Party politicians
Members of the National Assembly of Hungary (1990–1994)
People from Veszprém County
20th-century agronomists